Eat the Heat is the eighth studio album by German heavy metal band Accept, released in 1989. It was recorded at Dierks Studios in Cologne from September 1988 to January 1989. Although Jim Stacey is presented as rhythm guitar player in the album line-up, the album credits also state that all guitar work on the album was played by Wolf Hoffmann. Stacey did perform second guitar live with the band.
Until 2010's Blood of the Nations, this was Accept's only album without Udo Dirkschneider as lead vocalist. U.D.O. contributes with crowd vocals on "Turn the Wheel". U.D.O. has also covered the song "X-T-C" on the 2001 compilation A Tribute to Accept II. Accept later recorded "Generation Clash II" based on "Generation Clash" with Udo Dirkschneider on vocals for their 1994 album Death Row.  U.D.O. will still regularly perform tracks from this album, including "X-T-C".

Critical reception
The Rolling Stone Album Guide wrote that "though the album delivers much of the punch of its predecessors, the songs seem flat by comparison."

Track listings
All lyrics and music written by Accept and Deaffy.

European version

U.S. version

2014 remastered version

Personnel
Band members
 David Reece – vocals
 Wolf Hoffmann – all guitars
 Peter Baltes – bass
 Stefan Kaufmann – drums

Additional Musicians
 Jim Stacey – rhythm guitar in live shows
 Jacky Virgil - backing vocals on "Chain Reaction"
 Mark Dodson - crowd vocals on "Turn the Wheel"

Production
Dieter Dierks – producer, engineer, mixing, arrangements with Accept
Topo – mixing, assistant engineer
Norbert Gutzmann – technician
Bob Ludwig – mastering at Masterdisk, New York
Gaby "Deaffy" Hauke – management, cover idea
George Chin – cover photo
Ashley Kramer – back photo
Hentschel Grafic Service – cover design

Supporting tour
The Eat the Heat tour consisted of David Reece on vocals, Wolf Hoffmann on lead guitar, Peter Baltes on bass, Stefan Kaufmann on drums, and Jim Stacey (ex-Break Point) on rhythm guitar. The first leg of the tour consisted of the band headlining at small clubs around the U.S. for about two months. Kaufmann sustained a back injury during this period, and was replaced by House of Lords drummer Ken Mary. Accept then began a North American act with W.A.S.P. and Metal Church. The tour overall was a disappointment, plagued with poor attendance numbers and a failure to draw the American crowds that the band had hoped to appeal to with this new lineup. A rumored behind-stage fight at the Vic Theater in Chicago between Reece and Baltes led to the band splitting up, and the tour was subsequently cancelled.

Charts

References

1989 albums
Accept (band) albums
RCA Records albums
Epic Records albums
Albums produced by Dieter Dierks
Glam metal albums